Christian P. Robert is a French statistician, specializing in Bayesian statistics and Monte Carlo methods.

Career 

Christian Robert studied at ENSAE then defended his PhD in 1987 at Université de Rouen. He held temporary positions at Purdue and Cornell before being  an Associate Professor at Université Paris 6, and then Professor at Université de Rouen. He was also Professor of Statistics at École Polytechnique and director of Center for Research in Economics and Statistics.
As of 2021, he is Professor at CEREMADE, Université Paris-Dauphine and a part-time member of the Department of Statistics, University of Warwick.

Works 

Christian Robert is the author of several textbooks on Bayesian inference and Monte Carlo methods, including:

 Robert, Christian. The Bayesian choice: from decision-theoretic foundations to computational implementation. Springer Science & Business Media, 2007.
 Robert, Christian, and George Casella. Monte Carlo statistical methods. Springer Science & Business Media, 2013.
 Marin, Jean-Michel, and Christian P. Robert. Bayesian essentials with R. New York: Springer, 2014.

Service 

Robert served as the editor in chief of the Journal of the Royal Statistical Society, Series B, from 2006 to 2009. He was president of the International Society for Bayesian Analysis in 2008. In 2016 he was joint program chair of the AIStats conference.

Awards 
 Fellow of the Institute of Mathematical Statistics (1996)
 Fellow of the Royal Statistical Society (1998)
 International Society for Bayesian Analysis DeGroot prize for the Bayesian Choice (2003)
 Fellow of the American Statistical Association (2012)
 Fellow of the International Society for Bayesian Analysis (2014)

References 

1961 births
French statisticians
Living people
Fellows of the Institute of Mathematical Statistics
Academic staff of École Polytechnique
Academics of the University of Warwick
University of Rouen Normandy alumni